Agents of Mayhem is an open world action-adventure video game developed by Volition and published by Deep Silver. The game was released in August 2017 for PlayStation 4, Windows, and Xbox One. The game's themes are based on Saturday-morning cartoons and superhero films. It is set in a parallel universe of Volition's Saints Row series, and includes several plot and character crossovers. Agents of Mayhem received mixed reviews; it was generally praised for its humor, characters and combat, but criticized for its repetitiveness. It was a commercial disappointment, which lead to layoffs at Volition.

Gameplay 
Agents of Mayhem is an action-adventure open world game played from a third-person perspective. The game features twelve agents, and players can choose any three to complete missions and explore the world. The agents are comprised in four trios: the Bombshells (Italian engineer Joule, Indian immunologist Rama, and German football hooligan Red Card); the Carnage a Trois (American field strategist Braddock, American derby driver Daisy, and Russian "Cold Warrior" Oleg Kirrlov under the alias "Yeti"); the Firing Squad (American gang leader Pierce Washington under the alias "Kingpin", Japanese hitman Oni, and Middle Eastern assassin Scheherazade); and the Franchise Force (Colombian former sky pirate Fortune, United States Navy chief petty officer Hardtack, and Canadian actor and proclaimed "Face of Mayhem" Hollywood). Three additional agents are provided via downloadable content:

Each agent has their own unique play-style and abilities. For instance, Hardtack uses a shotgun as his primary weapon, while Hollywood utilizes his assault rifle. As players deal damage to enemies with their weapons, players accumulate points that will fill up a bar. When the bar is filled, players can utilize the agents' Mayhem abilities, which are superpower moves that greatly aid the player in combat. Different agents have different mayhem abilities. For example, Fortune can use her drone, GLORY to stun enemies, while Hollywood can trigger massive explosions around him. Players can switch between the three agents they have selected freely, and experiment with different combinations of agents to see which trio of characters suit their playstyle the most. Movement in the game is fast. The agents can triple-jump around the city or use cars to traverse the game's world.

In addition to the main campaign missions, there are also unlock missions, which unlock new agents for players to control, and personal missions, which delve into the back-story of these agents. Different agents will have different personalities, and their responses to in-game events vary. As the player progresses in the game, the agents will gain experience points, cash, skills, new gadgets, and mods that enhance their combat efficiency. There are also cosmetic customization options for the agents and weapons featured in the game.

Synopsis

Setting 
Agents of Mayhem takes place in a futuristic version of Seoul, South Korea, billed as "the city of tomorrow".

The game is part of a multiverse alongside Volition's Saints Row and Red Faction series, taking place after the "recreate Earth" ending of the Saints Row IV stand-alone expansion, Gat out of Hell. The game's plot revolves around an organization known as M.A.Y.H.E.M. (Multinational AgencY Hunting Evil Masterminds), founded by Persephone Brimstone (a character first seen in Gat out of Hell) and funded by the Ultor Corporation (one of the main antagonists of Saints Row 2 and the Red Faction series, later merging with the Saints in Saints Row: The Third). Bearing the Saints' purple fleur-de-lis logo, M.A.Y.H.E.M's goal is to stop supervillain organization L.E.G.I.O.N. (the League of Evil Gentlemen Intent on Obliterating Nations) from destroying the world's nations.

Plot 

In the backstory, Persephone Brimstone was once part of the supervillain organization L.E.G.I.O.N and part of their plans for world conquest, as well as married to the Minister of Envy. L.E.G.I.O.N would reveal themselves to the public with a worldwide attack to topple the world's governments that would be called "Devil's Night". Persephone learned that L.E.G.I.O.N's leader, the Morningstar plotted to harvest the power of Dark Matter to alter reality and ascend into godhood. Persephone put a stop to those plans and took off with an airship called the ARK, and in retaliation, L.E.G.I.O.N. and her husband launched an attack on her home city of Paris. Having turned against L.E.G.I.O.N completely, Persephone used whatever recourses she could get her hands on to form M.A.Y.H.E.M and take revenge on L.E.G.I.O.N. "Devil's Night" would also play into the backstories of many of M.A.Y.H.E.M's agents.

At the start of the game, Persephone sets up M.A.Y.H.E.M in Seoul, South Korea where they track down Dr. Babylon, the ambitious leader of the Ministry of Pride for L.E.G.I.O.N. who plans on harvesting a giant dark matter crystal from a comet. The Franchise Force is sent to kill him but fail. To distract M.A.Y.H.E.M, Babylon uses his lieutenant Hammersmith to cause destruction around Seoul to distract M.A.Y.H.E.M before Hammersmith is defeated by the agents. Babylon then uses August Gaunt, a young singer and another one of his lieutenants to brainwash his fans and attempt to turn the city of Seoul against M.A.Y.H.E.M, but the agents confront him at his concert and shut down his technology, exposing Gaunt as a fraud.

M.A.Y.H.E.M then plans to retrieve a sentient computer program called AISHA, a virtual female idol group that L.E.G.I.O.N is using as a virus, but one of Babylon's cybernetic lieutenants by the name of Steeltoe falls in love with AISHA and starts a relationship with her. Steeltoe and AISHA intend to merge their AI's, but Steeltoe is killed by M.A.Y.H.E.M'S agents at their "wedding". A vengeful AISHA, led by their red avatar, begin a smear campaign against M.A.Y.H.E.M, eventually taking to creating a musical single that would kill its listeners, before eventually starting an attack on the ARK'S computer programs. The other AISHA's realize how unstable Red Aisha is, but most of them are killed leaving only the Red and Purple AISHA. The Purple AISHA willingly defects to M.A.Y.H.E.M as their agents destroy the Red AISHA.

Getting desperate, Babylon sends in Ariadne, the brilliant daughter of a scientist Babylon killed before trying to brainwash her with a microchip. Ariadne overcomes the microchip, but the effort drove her insane and she plots revenge on Babylon. Ariadne launches robot attacks on Seoul, and abducts multiple people, including M.A.Y.H.E.M's technological engineer Katy "Gremlin" Fox. The agents go on to rescue Gremlin, but while they are successful, Ariadne manages to escape before cutting the microchip out of her head.

Finally, M.A.Y.H.E.M seek to find Babylon's giant robot called Project Damocles, but when they eventually uncover it, Babylon launches a citywide attack, and even an attack on the ARK before commandeering Damocles and extracting the dark matter crystal. It's then revealed that Ariadne had placed her microchip in Damocles to drive Babylon insane as revenge. This backfires, when Babylon realizes he now has the ultimate power in L.E.G.I.O.N and goes on a bid to usurp the Morningstar and remake reality in his image. Babylon uses Damocles to go on a rampage and the power of the dark matter crystal to begin to rewrite reality where he rules the world. The agents enter the rift to battle Babylon and his recreated minions, and eventually destroy the dark matter crystal. With the crystal destroyed, reality goes back to normal as the Damocles crashes to the Earth. Babylon and the agents survive the crash, but Babylon is taken and presumably killed by L.E.G.I.O.N enforcer Marcus Longinus as punishment for his failure, while Persephone has M.A.Y.H.E.M pull out of Seoul.

Development 
Development of the game began shortly after the release of Saints Row IV. The game began its development cycle as some concept art and character descriptions, and after receiving positive comments from outsiders who have listened to their pitch, one of whom described it as "G.I. Joe versus Cobra Megafight 2020", the game soon entered full production. Unlike previous Saints Row games, which have only one player-controlled protagonist, Agents of Mayhem introduces multiple playable characters. This was done because Volition reflected on some of their previous fan events, where fans opted to cosplay as the supporting characters rather than the central character. They considered it an evidence to show that fans of the franchise would be interested in a character-focused game. Another reason is that the company, inspired by League of Legends and Dota 2, wanted players to form a strong connection with the characters. Volition also thought that the game, being a single-player title, has a great advantage, since most games with a diverse cast of characters are multiplayer-focused. The game's tone and style was inspired by 1980s action cartoons such as G.I. Joe, He-Man, and television series like The A-Team.

In 2014, after receiving $200,000 in incentives from the city of Champaign, Illinois, Volition began hiring upwards of 100 employees to begin work on a new project. Little was known about this game until a trademark for Agents of Mayhem filed by Koch Media (Deep Silver's parent company) was discovered in May 2016, along with résumés linking the project to Volition. Further speculation arose from a 2013 Polygon interview with Volition's Scott Phillips, referring to Saints Row players as "agent[s] of mayhem". The game was formally announced on June 6, 2016 with a cinematic announcement trailer released via IGN. Agents of Mayhem was released in North America on August 15, 2017 and in Europe on August 18, 2017.

Reception 

Agents of Mayhem received "mixed or average" reviews, according to review aggregator Metacritic.

Nick Valdez's 7/10 score on Destructoid stated that the game was "Solid and definitely has an audience. There could be some hard-to-ignore faults, but the experience is fun."

5/10 was Alice Bell's score on VideoGamer.com, who said "Despite fun combat and characters, Agents of Mayhem becomes repetitive and grinding. In trying to chase the popularity of Saints Row, it misses having an identity of its own."

Michael Goroff's score of 7/10 on Electronic Gaming Monthly said that "Agents of Mayhem is one of those games with so much potential that just doesn’t quite reach the heights it probably could. That being said, it’s exhilarating combat and unique character system have me looking forward to a more polished, more fully conceived sequel."

Connor Sheridan said on GamesRadar "Hero-swapping tactics add a unique edge to third-person combat, while humor and heart elevate Agents of Mayhem's typical world-saving fundamentals to memorable heights," and awarded it a score of 4 out of 5 stars.

Dan Ryckert from Giant Bomb gave the game a score of 2 out of 5 stars saying that "It may share a genre and universe with Saints Row, but Agents of Mayhem is a lifeless husk of Volition's prior work."

"With fun combat and a likable cast, Agents of Mayhem leans too heavily on repetitive fights to be truly heroic," was Jon Ryan's conclusion on IGN with a score of 7.1/10.

PC Gamers Jon Morcom scored the game a 67/100 with the consensus that it "Serves up a generous range of play styles, but it’s hampered by repetitive levels and a few uninspired design choices."

Justin McElroy of Polygon awarded it 5.5/10 stating that "This has likely started to feel like a litany of sins rather than cogent critique, but it’s the best way I have of illustrating Agent of Mayhem'''s failings. It is not felled by any one thing, but is rather undone by a thousand little cuts. Agents of Mayhem heaps theoretical fun on you. Characters, powers, upgrades, tons of missions — it’s desperate for the player to just have fun. It’s a noble impulse, but one that it’s depressingly incapable of consistently delivering on.

Brett Todd, in a review for GameSpot, concluded "there's little to Agents of Mayhem beyond its foul-mouthed and bombastic attitude, which push the game into grating and obnoxious territory. Throw in the poor mission design and bugs, and you've got a game with loads of mayhem, but not much else."

SalesAgents of Mayhem was the 16th-highest-selling games in the United States for August 2017, according to the NPD Group. It was the fourth-highest-selling game in the United Kingdom during the week of its release. The disappointing sales numbers of the game led to cost reductions at Volition in September 2017, reportedly resulting in layoffs of over 30 people at the studio, which previously had around 200 employees.

As of October 2017, the game has grossed €19 million. As of February 2018, it has sold 300,000 copies.

Accolades
The game was nominated for "Performance in a Comedy, Supporting" with Eliza Schneider as Agent Rama, and for "Writing in a Comedy" at the National Academy of Video Game Trade Reviewers Awards.

Related media
A board game titled Agents of Mayhem: Pride of Babylon'', developed by Academy Games, was successfully crowdfunded via Kickstarter in February 2018.

References

External links 
 

2017 video games
Action-adventure games
Science fiction comedy
Deep Silver games
Organized crime video games
Open-world video games
PlayStation 4 games
Single-player video games
Saints Row
Science fiction video games
Video games developed in the United States
Video games set in Seoul
Windows games
Xbox One games
Xbox One X enhanced games